Janmashathru is a 1988 Indian Malayalam film, directed by K. S. Gopalakrishnan and produced by Malithra Production. The film stars Anuradha, Balan K. Nair and Bheeman Raghu in the lead roles. The film has musical score by Cochin Alex.

Cast
Anuradha as Savithri
Balan K. Nair as Avarachan
Bheeman Raghu as SI Raghu
Vincent  as Nissar
 Nellikode Bhaskaran  as Nanu Pilla
 Sathaar as Johnny

Soundtrack
The music was composed by Cochin Alex and the lyrics were written by Bharanikkavu Sivakumar and Varkala Sreekumar.

References

External links
 

1988 films
1980s Malayalam-language films
Films directed by K. S. Gopalakrishnan